Gilda Aranda (born 19 November 1933) is a Mexican former swimmer. She competed in the women's 100 metre freestyle at the 1956 Summer Olympics.

References

External links
 

1933 births
Living people
Olympic swimmers of Mexico
Swimmers at the 1956 Summer Olympics
Place of birth missing (living people)
Pan American Games bronze medalists for Mexico
Pan American Games medalists in swimming
Swimmers at the 1955 Pan American Games
Central American and Caribbean Games gold medalists for Mexico
Central American and Caribbean Games medalists in swimming
Competitors at the 1954 Central American and Caribbean Games
Mexican female freestyle swimmers
Medalists at the 1955 Pan American Games
20th-century Mexican women
21st-century Mexican women